Events in the year 1952 in Norway.

Incumbents
 Monarch – Haakon VII
 Prime Minister – Oscar Torp (Labour Party)

Events

 7 January – 15 people are kiled in a mine explosion in Svalbard.
 14–25 February – 1952 Winter Olympics are held in Oslo.
 Around April 4 five Norwegian seal hunting vessels went down in a storm in the West Ice. The West Ice accidents claimed 78 lives in total.
 24 November – Folketeatret (lit. The People's Theatre) opened in Oslo.

Popular culture

Sports

Olaf Barda, chess player, becomes the first Norwegian to be awarded the title of International Master

Music

Film

 20 March – Thor Heyerdahl received the Academy Award for Best Documentary Feature at the 24th Academy Awards for the Kon-Tiki film.

Literature

Notable births
25 January – Inga Balstad, politician
11 March – Vigdis Giltun, politician
6 March – Nils Johan Ringdal, author and historian (died 2008)
15 April – Ragnar Hovland, novelist, essayist, poet, and writer of children's books.
25 April – Ketil Bjørnstad, pianist and composer
2 May – Gunda Johansen, politician
13 May – Lars Amund Vaage, author and playwright
19 May – Guri Ingebrigtsen, politician (died 2020)
19 June – Sidsel Endresen, jazz singer
25 June – Radka Toneff, jazz singer (died 1982)
10 July – Kari Husøy, politician
18 July – Per Petterson, novelist
27 July – Torfinn Bjarkøy, civil servant
8 August – Jostein Gaarder, author
11 August – Finn Sletten, jazz drummer
19 August – Lillian Müller, model and actress
9 September – Per Jørgensen, jazz trumpeter
18 September – Gunn Olsen, politician
23 September – Unni Holmen, artistic gymnast.
25 October – Helen Fløisand, politician
8 November – Carl Haakon Waadeland, musicologist and drummer
18 November – Gerd Janne Kristoffersen, politician
28 November – Ole Thomsen, jazz guitarist
16 December – Jon Laukvik, organist

Full date unknown
Anne-Lise Bakken, politician and Minister
Magnus Takvam, journalist

Notable deaths

11 February – Ola Torstensen Lyngstad, politician (born 1894)
14 February – Johan Clementz, boxer (born 1894)
19 February – Knut Hamsun, author, Nobel Prize in Literature laureate (born 1859)
13 March – Johan Nygaardsvold, politician and Prime Minister of Norway (born 1879)
20 April – Sigurd Maseng, diplomat (born 1894)
14 May – Carl Julius Alvin Westerlund, politician (born 1885)
13 June – Andreas Brecke, sailor and Olympic gold medallist (born 1879)
3 August – Even Ulving, painter (born 1863).
26 September – Aslak Nilsen, politician (born 1898).
28 September – Ingvald Tøndel, politician (born 1887)
14 November – Aldor Ingebrigtsen, politician (born 1888)
14 December – Fartein Valen, composer and musical theorist (born 1887)

Full date unknown
Einar Borch, landowner and politician (born 1870).
Adam Egede-Nissen, politician (born 1868)
Christian Wegner Haaland, ship-owner and politician (born 1892)
Knut Liestøl, politician and Minister (born 1881)
William Martin Nygaard, publisher and politician (born 1865)

See also

References